Zhou Ji (born August 26, 1946) is a Chinese mechanical engineer and politician. He served as China's Minister of Education from 2003 to 2009 and President of the Chinese Academy of Engineering from 2010 to 2018. Prior to that, served briefly as Mayor of Wuhan, the capital of Hubei Province.

Biography
Zhou is a native of Shanghai, and attended Tsinghua University in Beijing, where he graduated from in 1970, and received M.E. degree in mechanical engineering from Huazhong University of Science and Technology in 1980. Zhou also acquired a doctorate from the University at Buffalo, The State University of New York (PhD, '84, M.S.'81) in the United States. Much of his early career was spent at the Huazhong University of Science and Technology in Wuhan, where he eventually rose to become the president of Huazhong University of Science and Technology in 1997. He was elected as the fellow of the Chinese Academy of Engineering in 1999. He then spent a tenure in the municipal government of Wuhan, where he served as deputy mayor and Mayor.

He was transferred to work in the Ministry of Education of the People's Republic of China in 2002 as its Vice-Minister, rising to the Minister position on March 17, 2003. At the re-elections of the 2008 National People's Congress, Zhou received the fewest votes in favour out of any minister. He received 384 votes against, with 81 abstentions. During Zhou's time in office, China's education system continued to be plagued by academic dishonesty, corruption, and arbitrary fees, with no discernible signs of improvement. Zhou was also unpopular due to his introduction of 16 "officially sanctioned" educational Peking Opera works, some of which allegedly included themes similar to those during the Cultural Revolution. These works were openly opposed by members of the Chinese People's Political Consultative Conference in March 2009. He was removed in October 2009 at a regular session of the National People's Congress; he was replaced by deputy Yuan Guiren.

He was instead appointed deputy party secretary at the Chinese Academy of Engineering in Beijing, a "less important but still significant post," according to the Chronicle of Higher Education.   Stanley Rosen, director of the East Asian Studies Center at the University of Southern California, commented that Mr. Zhou's new post does not suggest serious punishment, and is  "a sign that he's a scapegoat, not that he's corrupt."

Due to the contribution in numeric control, computer-aided design, and design optimization, he was selected as the foreign associate of the United States National Academy of Engineering in 2013.
 
In 2018 he was elected an International Fellow of the Royal Academy of Engineering in the UK.

See also 
 List of International Fellows of the Royal Academy of Engineering

References

External links
 Biography at China Vitae

1946 births
Living people
Mayors of Wuhan
Members of the Chinese Academy of Engineering
Ministers of Education of the People's Republic of China
People's Republic of China politicians from Shanghai
Tsinghua University alumni
University at Buffalo alumni
Presidents of Huazhong University of Science and Technology
Fellows of the Royal Academy of Engineering
Chinese mechanical engineers
Foreign associates of the National Academy of Engineering